The 2006–07 European football season was the 103rd season of Sport Lisboa e Benfica's existence and the club's 73rd consecutive season in the top flight of Portuguese football. The season ran from 1 July 2006 to 30 June 2007; Benfica competed domestically in the Primeira Liga and the Taça de Portugal. The club also participated in the UEFA Champions League as a result of finishing third in the Primeira Liga in the previous season.

After manager Ronald Koeman's departure, Benfica immediately searched for a replacement. Media speculated the club would sign Sven-Göran Eriksson and later Carlos Queiroz, but Benfica signed the former Porto and Sporting CP manager Fernando Santos. Santos was the first manager since Fernando Riera to manage all of Portugal's Big Three clubs. In the transfer market, Benfica brought back Rui Costa and recruited other notable players including Katsouranis and David Luiz. Fabrizio Miccoli had his loan renewed for a second year, while Geovanni, Manuel Fernandes and Ricardo Rocha left the club during the season.

Because of their league finish, Benfica had to pass Austria Wien to enter the group stage of the season's Champions League. Domestically, Benfica's season started erratically, losing 11 points from three losses and a draw before December. In Europe, the situation was similar; Benfica never recovered a five-point deficit to Celtic by day three, ending with seven points and demotion to the UEFA Cup. From December until April, Benfica regained lost ground in the Primeira Liga, climbing to second place—a point away from Porto, which was also advancing until the quarter-finals of UEFA Cup

In April, Benfica had the opportunity to reach the league's top place if they won the Clássico with Porto; however, they only managed a 1–1 draw. It was the first of five winless games that caused them to drop to third place and be eliminated from Europe by Espanyol. Despite an improvement in form, Benfica wasted a chance to retake second place after another home draw against arch-rival club Sporting. Benfica ended the season in third place, with two fewer points than Porto, ensuring a place in the Champions League.

Season summary

Pre-season
In the aftermath of Ronald Koeman's departure, Portuguese media began to speculate about Benfica's next manager. They initially focused on Sven-Göran Eriksson, who had previously managed the club and was in Algarve preparing for the World Cup with England's national squad. On 17 May, Eriksson said he had not been approached to join Benfica. José Antonio Camacho's agent dismissed speculation about his return. On 19 May, SIC Notícias announced Carlos Queiroz had signed a two-year deal with Benfica. Both parties immediately denied any agreement; Queiroz said he did not intend to leave Manchester United. The following day, Benfica presented Fernando Santos as the club's new manager on a two-year contract. Santos had last managed in Portugal in 2003–04, when he led Sporting to a third-place finish, and previously spent three years at Porto, winning five major titles. He became the third manager—the first Portuguese—to manage all of the country's Big Three football clubs, after Otto Glória and Fernando Riera. He would be assisted by Fernando Chalana, who remained connected with the club's management; Jorge Rosário as his long-term technical assistant; Bruno Moura as physiotherapist and Ricardo Santos as scout of the opponents.

Benfica's first signing of the season was Rui Costa nicknamed "The Maestro", who arrived for free and was well received by 3,000 supporters. He reportedly took a large pay cut to join Benfica. After Costa, Benfica selected Kostas Katsouranis as their top target in the search for another central midfielder. They negotiated with AEK Athens for over two weeks and agreed a transfer on 22 June. Benfica was also interested in signing Andrés D'Alessandro, but the deal fell through. In the offence, Fabrizio Miccoli had his loan deal renewed for a further season, and Benfica signed another option, Mexican striker, Francisco Fonseca. The biggest losses for Santos were the release of Geovanni—a regular starter for three-and-a-half seasons— and Manuel Fernandes, who joined Portsmouth on a loan deal.

The pre-season began on 3 July with medical exams during the morning and an afternoon visit to Nyon, where Benfica were camped during their pre-season tour of Switzerland. Santos implemented a new tactical formation based on the 4–4–2 diamond. Benfica played their first game against Swiss second-tier side Stade Nyonnais, beating them by a comfortable margin. They followed this with a win against Shakhtar Donetsk in Yverdon-les-Bains, and a loss against FC Sion at the Stade Tourbillon on 15 July. Benfica returned to Portugal on 16 July; they played a presentation match against Bordeaux on 22 July. They then competed in the 2006 Guadiana Trophy alongside their arch-rivals Sporting CP and Deportivo La Coruña, losing both matches. On 28 July, Benfica took part in the draw for the third qualifying round of the UEFA Champions League; they were paired with Austria Wien. Santos dismissed accusations of favouritism with the Austrians, saying, "It is a question of honour to be present in the Champions League, for me and for Benfica." Benfica's next preparation match was at AEK Athens on 1 August, where they lost for the third time in a row. The result caused concern to Santos because Benfica "showed a lot of tactical problems, both offensively and defensively." Benfica played their final preparation match on 15 August, where they defeated Estrela da Amadora 2–1.

August–September
Benfica first competitive game of the season was the third qualifying round of the Champions League. Before the match, Santos expressed the importance of reaching the group stage: "More important than the formation used is to fulfil our purpose: take part in the group stage of the competition." On 8 August, Benfica visited the Ernst-Happel-Stadion to play Austria Wien. Benfica scored first with a back-heeled goal from Nuno Gomes in the 16th minute, while Austria equalized through Jocelyn Blanchard in the 36th minute. The match resulted in a draw and Benfica gained a decisive advantage for the second leg. On 22 August, Benfica hosted Austria Wien for the second leg. The opening goal came from Rui Costa, with further Benfica goals scored by Nuno Gomes and Petit. Benfica had joined their rivals Porto and Sporting in the 2006–07 Champions League, marking the first time three Portuguese teams were present in the group stage. On 24 August, Benfica took part in the Champions League draw; they were drawn with Manchester United, Celtic and F.C. Copenhagen. It was second time in a row Benfica played with Manchester United in the group stage after eliminating them in 2005–06. Three days later, Benfica were due to meet Belenenses for the opening game of the Primeira Liga. However, because of the "Mateus Affair," the game was uncertain to occur; Santos expressed hopes for the quick resolution of the case, adding that it was bad for Portuguese football and that the uncertainty caused his players to lose focus. Two days before the match, the Portuguese Professional Football League announced that the game was postponed until the Portuguese Football Federation decided the outcome of the affair.

Benfica's next match was scheduled for 10 September, meaning they would go nearly 20 days without competing in the opening stage of the season. After the international break in early September, their first match in the Primeira Liga was set for 9 September, one day earlier because of their European match against Copeganhen on 13 September. In an away visit to Estádio do Bessa, where Santos had never won in his career, Benfica were defeated 3–0 by Boavista. Santos said the defeat was "heavy and out of context" and blamed the ejection of Nuno Gomes for emotionally destabilizing the team. On the following Wednesday, Benfica played Copenhagen at Parken Stadium. Neither team could break the deadlock and the game ended in goalless draw.

On 17 September, Benfica received Nacional at home. With Simão making his league debut, Benfica scored the only goal of the match when Simão assisted Luisão in the 29th minute. On the following Friday, Benfica played Paços de Ferreira on the road. Katsouranis scored the first goal for Benfica but Paços equalized in the 92nd minute. In Santos' analysis, Benfica controlled the match, but after "an inexplicable ejection from Léo, the home team got back into the game." Four days later, Benfica received Manchester United for the second matchday of the group stage. A single goal from Louis Saha in the 61st minute won United the match and the lead in the group standings. It was Benfica's 12th loss in 20 matches against English teams in Europe and the fifth loss in six matches against United. Santos said Benfica played "60 minutes of great quality," but was disappointed with loss and expressed a desire to improve the situation.

October–November

October began with a home-match against Desportivo das Aves. Benfica scored first through Paulo Jorge, but Aves equalized with a goal by Filipe Anunciação. In the second half, Benfica scored three more goals from Simão, Nuno Gomes and Katsouranis to win the match. Nuno Gomes said, "I hope this win is a turning point for us." After another international break, Benfica played União de Leiria at the Dr. Magalhães Pessoa on 14 September. They continued with their good momentum and won 4–0, with Miccoli bagging a double. Santos was happy with his team's display, saying, "It was a great game and my team was focused, organized and dynamic, building a result that translated what happened on the pitch." On the next Tuesday, Benfica visited Celtic Park for the first of a double-header against Celtic. Benfica had the upper hand in the first half, but Celtic scored two second-half goals in a ten-minute window and finished the game with a third. The win gave Celtic with a five-point lead over Benfica with three matchdays to go. Santos blamed the loss on the team's lack of composure after conceding the first goal. He said he believed Benfica could still qualify for the next round.

On 22 October, Benfica hosted Estrela da Amadora. The visitors scored first though Dário, but Benfica equalized in the first half and scored two more goals in the second, winning the match 3–1. Santos was highly critical of the referee Carlos Xistra, who issued 18 yellow cards and three red cards, one of them to Miccoli, who would therefore miss the next match, a visit to Porto. Five days later, Benfica played Porto in the first Clássico of the season. In a high-tension match, Benfica conceded two goals in the first half but equalized in the second half, drawing the game in the 82nd minute. However, in injury time, Bruno Moraes scored, bringing the score to 3–2 to Porto. Santos said the result was unfair, adding, "After he got back into the game and managed to level it, 'that' happened in the end."

On 1 November, Benfica hosted Celtic; they scored two goals in the first 25 minutes and a third through Andrei Karyaka in the 90th minute, winning by the same margin they had lost in Glasgow. Santos was happy with the win, saying, "We knew he had three 'finals' and now we have two. We are better now, with four points and closing in on Celtic." Four days later, Benfica hosted Beira-Mar for a Primeira Liga match. Benfica did not score until the second half, when in the 51st minute, Katsouranis headed in the match's first goal. Three minutes later, Petit scored the second and an own-goal from Beira-Mar made the score 3–0.

After the third international break, Benfica returned on 18 November with a match on the road against Braga. Quim had a particularly unfortunate game, making costly mistakes in two goals, and Benfica lost the match 3–1. Santos acknowledged his team's disappointing performance, saying, "We never controlled the game, despite having opportunities to even up. We had some reasonable moments but far away from our best." On the following Tuesday, Benfica played Copenhagen in Estádio da Luz for the fifth match-day of the group stage. Benfica scored three goals in the first half, two of them spaced by two minutes and winning the match 3–1. After news of Celtic's win against United, Benfica would only progress to the last 16 if they won at Old Trafford, which Santos believed to be possible. On the 25th, Benfica hosted Marítimo. Benfica scored first with an own-goal from Alex von Schwedler, but Marítimo levelled the score before half time through Marcinho. In the second half, Katsouranis scored the second Benfica goal, establishing the final result at 2–1 to Benfica. Santos criticized his players for "excessive individualism".

December–January
Benfica started December with the Derby de Lisboa against Sporting CP. The match was preponed by a day because of the European commitments of both clubs. Benfica started the game in the second minute with a goal from Ricardo Rocha; Simão increased it to 2–0 in the 35th minute, with Benfica holding onto the advantage until the end. Santos was pleased with his team's performance at Alvalade, saying, "Benfica could have score three goals". On 6 December, Benfica visited Old Trafford for their decisive group stage match against Manchester United. They surprised United with an opening goal from Nélson near the half-hour, but conceded an equalizer from Nemanja Vidić just before half time. In the second half, United scored twice more and won the match. The loss, which led to Benfica's demotion to the UEFA Cup, frustrated Santos, who said, "The goal they scored at the end of the first half led to a lot of problems for us. We're disappointed, as we believed it would be possible to progress." On 10 December, Benfica played Naval on at Estádio Municipal José Bento Pessoa. The result was a goalless draw and Benfica loast two points in the title race. Simão recognized Benfica were now dependent on others to win the league.

Five days later, Benfica was paired with Dinamo București in the draw in Nyon. The next day, they received Vitória de Setúbal at home. After an opening goal in the first half, Benfica added two more in the second for a 3–0 win. Santos complemented his team, predicting they could have added three or four more goals. On 21 December, Benfica played the match against Belenenses that was postponed from August. Benfica scored the first goal through a penalty from Simão; Giorgos Karagounis scored a second after converting a free-kick. In the second half, Benfica added two more goals for a 4–0 win.
Santos said "a 4–2 would more adequate for what happened on the pitch".

In January, the Taça de Portugal started for Benfica; they entered in the fourth round and played with Oliveira do Bairro from the third tier. As Rui Costa recovered from various injuries, Santos implemented a diamond formation with Costa supporting two strikers. Benfica put five goals past Oliveira do Bairro and advanced to the fifth round. Santos attributed the win to his players' attitude in the presence of an inferior opponent. Benfica's next match on 15 January was a visit to Estádio Cidade de Coimbra. Ricardo Rocha scored the opening goal for Benfica in the second minute and Léo scored the second in the 89th minute, ending the match 0–0 to Benfica. Santos called the match a great spectacle played at high-speed and where the win could have fallen for either side.

As the month progressed, Benfica made some squad adjustments, selling Francisco Fonseca back to Mexico and replacing him with Derlei on a loan from Dynamo Moscow. They then sold Ricardo Rocha to Tottenham Hotspur, and signed David Luiz, also on a loan deal, as his replacement. On 21 January, Benfica played the fifth round of the Portuguese Cup against União de Leiria. Harison scored first for Leiria, but Benfica countered with an equalizer from Nuno Gomes in the 80th minute and a winning goal from Mantorras five minutes later. Rui Costa was happy with the comeback because Benfica remained in all three fronts. Benfica's last match of January was a visit to Restelo to play Belenenses. Costa assisted Simão for the opening goal and before half time assisted Luisão for the second, with Benfica winning 2–1.

February–March
On 2 February, Benfica played host to Boavista. They had several opportunities to beat William, but Boavista prevented them all. The match ended in a goalless draw, leaving Benfica one point away from the Estádio da Luz. Santos accepted the draw, saying, "I do not like to speak about luck or misfortune. The ball just would not go in. That is it." Eight days later, Benfica travelled to Estádio do Varzim to play the sixth round of the Portuguese Cup against Segunda Liga-side Varzim. The hosts opened the score with an own goal from Nélson in the 13th minute, but Benfica equalizer with a goal from Simão at the half-hour mark. In the second half, Varzim pressed again and António Mendonça scored a match-winning 77th-minute goal. Benfica's elimination at the hands of Varzim was the third time in Santos' career he was knocked-out of the Portuguese Cup by a team from lower divisions, the other clubs being Porto and Sporting.

On 14 February, Benfica began their 2006–07 UEFA Cup campaign with a home game against Dinamo București. They struggled to convert goal chances, having hit the goalposts twice in the second half. Miccoli finally broke Dinamo's defence with a 90th-minute goal. Four days later, the Italian led Benfica to a win in Choupana against Nacional, allowing Benfica to overtake Sporting and reach second place in the Primeira Liga, four points behind Porto. On 22 February, Benfica visited the Stadionul Dinamo for the second leg with Dinamo, beating them 2–1 to reach to the round of 16. Benfica played their last match of the month against Paços de Ferreira on 25 February. They won the match by 3–1 against the Paços de Ferreira-based side due to double from Simão and another from Nuno Gomes. The win opened a three-point gap over Sporting, but Santos said, "That is not what matters. It is our three points. We have 4 points deficit from Porto and we will try to get closer."

With Benfica committed to the league race, March was a critical month for the club's aspirations. Their first game was a visit to Aves to play Desportivo de Aves. The home team had an opportunity to lead with a penalty kick in the 36th minute, but Quim stopped Hernâni Borges's shot. In the second half, Nuno Gomes scored the match's only goal when he answered a cross from Nélson. Santos said the result was better than the performance. On the next Thursday, Benfica played Paris St-Germain at the Parc des Princes. Benfica scored first with header from Simão in the tenth minute, but PSG reacted with two goals in five minutes before half-time. The score remained unchanged, giving Benfica a one-goal disadvantage. On 12 March, Benfica met União de Leiria at home for match-day 21. Benfica won 2–0 with goals from Simão and Petit, keeping up the pressure on Porto.

Three days after Leiria, Benfica received PSG for the second leg. Benfica scored their first goal in the 12th minute and another before half-time. However, the Parisians got back into the game with a goal from Pauleta. Throughout the second half, Benfica threatened Mickaël Landreau's goalposts, finally scoring near the 90th minute when Simão converted a penalty resulting from a foul on Léo. Simão told the media, "We knew we were stronger and had to take advantage of their mistakes. That is what he did." In the quarter-finals, Benfica were due to play Spanish side Espanyol, first in Barcelona and then in Lisbon. Domestically, Benfica played Estrela da Amadora on 19 March. Because Sporting had beat Porto in the match between them, Benfica could close up their distance from the top of the table to one point if they won. At the Estádio da Reboleira, Benfica defeated Estrela 1–0 with a goal from Petit in the 81st minute. The win left Benfica with 51 points, one fewer than Porto. The Clássico was the next match; Santos lowered fans' expectations by saying the league race was open for all of the Big Three and that there were still eight match-days to go before the season's end.

April–May
Benfica ended March with their objectives intact, so April became a crucial month. After a ten-day international break, Benfica resumed competition with the Clássico at home against Porto on 1 April. The visitors scored first through Pepe in the 41st minute, but Benfica equalized in the 83rd minute with an own-goal from Lucho González. Santos attributed the draw to Porto goalkeeper Helton's performance, saying, "Helton made three or four great saves. We were better in the second half and we deserved to win." On the following Thursday, Benfica visited the Olímpic de Montjuïc to face Espanyol. The Spaniards pushed hard from early on and scored first through Raúl Tamudo in the 15th minute; shortly after the half-hour mark, Albert Riera made it 2–0 and in the second half, Walter Pandiani added a third goal. Benfica reacted; Nuno Gomes scored to make the score 3–1 in the 63rd minute. Two minutes later, Simão scored Benfica's second goal and the match ended in a 3–2 loss. Santos blamed the poor first half for the loss, saying, "Like with Porto, we were lost in the first half, and let our opponent play." On 9 April, Benfica played Beira-Mar at the Estádio Municipal de Aveiro. Beira-Mar surprised Benfica and imposed on them a 2–2 draw in a match that Santos had labelled "title deciding". Santos accepted the result and commented, "We have to think in Thursday match, because our game today was bad. Beira-Mar had a lot of merit. The title is now harder but we will not renounce it." On 12 April, Benfica received Espanyol for the second leg of the quarter-finals. A slow first half contrasted with a high-pressure second, in which the woodwork and Gorka Iraizoz helped Espanyol defend the goalless draw, allowing Espanyol to proceed to the semi-finals.

Four days later, Benfica hosted Braga, who were searching for their first win of April. Benfica enjoyed a slight superiority throughout the match but could not surpass Braga's defence. Paulo Santos ended the game unbeaten. The third consecutive draw had negative consequences for the league race; Porto increased their lead to five points and Sporting climbed to second place in exchange for Benfica after recovering five points in the past three matchdays. Santos accepted the title was no longer an objective, saying, "We are not mathematically removed from it, but we are clearly very far from winning it ... Now we have to fight for second place, because it is crucial." On 21 April, Benfica travelled to Funchal to play Marítimo. Miccoli was essential in Benfica's game, scoring the first two goals in a 3–0 win, the first in April for Benfica. For their last match of April, Benfica received Sporting at home. Without Simão, who was injured, Benfica suffered an early setback when Liédson scored for Sporting in the second minute. Benfica equalized with a goal from Miccoli 20 minutes later, ending the game 1–1. Santos blamed bad luck for the draw.

In May, Benfica were chasing second place; they met Naval on 5 May. As with Marítimo, Miccoli was vital in securing the win, helping Petit score the first and then scoring the winner with two minutes to spare. Santos was satisfied, but said Benfica needed to do better, complaining of excessive individualism from his players. On 13 May, Benfica visited Estádio do Bonfim to play Vitória de Setúbal. They struggled to beat Setúbal goalkeeper Nikola Milojević until Miccoli broke the deadlock in the 79th minute. Santos commented on Benfica's chances in winning the Primeira Liga, saying, "While [it] is mathematically possible, I will believe in it." Miccoli, who scored his fifth goal in four matches, told the media he about his future, "I would like to stay. Love the club, love the team and the fans. Benfica is everything to me." A week later, on the final day of the league, Benfica received and beat Académica 2–0, with goals from Derlei and Mantorras. Because both rivals had won, Benfica finished in third place with 67 points, two behind winners Porto and one behind Sporting, missing out on direct entry to the 2007–08 UEFA Champions League. Despite the trophy-less season, Santos refused to label the season negative, saying, "Not winning titles is never good, but calling this season negative is a step I will not take." Benfica ended the season with tour of North America, playing Toronto FC and AEK Athens. During the tour, Santos predicted he would win the title in the next season, while Benfica President Luís Filipe Vieira said Benfica would invest heavily to make the team more competitive.

Competitions

Overall record

Primeira Liga

League table

Results by round

Matches

Taça de Portugal

UEFA Champions League

Third qualifying round

Group F

UEFA Cup

Round of 32

Round of 16

Quarter-finals

Friendlies

Player statistics
The squad for the season consisted of the players listed in the tables below, as well as staff member Fernando Santos (manager), Jorge Rosário (assistant manager), Fernando Chalana, (assistant manager), Bruno Moura (physiotherapist), Ricardo Santos (scout).

|}

Transfers

In

In by loan

Out

Out by loan

See also
 2006–07 in Portuguese football

References
 Specific

 General
 

S.L. Benfica seasons
Benfica